Thangso Baite is an Indian politician. He was a member of the 15th and 16th Lok Sabha from 2009 to 2019 representing the Outer Manipur constituency in the state of Manipur, situated in the North-Eastern India. He was a candidate for the Indian National Congress (INC) political party. He is the second son of (L) Shri Ngamkhotong Baite and (L) Smt. Otvah Baite and hails from Dongjang Village, Churachandpur District, Manipur.

Prior to this, he was also a member of the 8th Manipur Legislative Assembly from 2002 to 2007 representing the 60-Singhat (ST) Assembly Constituency and served as Minister of State, Government of Manipur from 2002 to 2005.

References

External links
 Official biographical sketch in Parliament of India website

Living people
Manipur politicians
India MPs 2009–2014
1953 births
People from Churachandpur district
Lok Sabha members from Manipur
India MPs 2014–2019